Carlos Adames (born 7 May 1994) is a Dominican professional boxer. He is currently the WBC interim middleweight champion, having held the belt since October 2022. He previously challenged for the WBO interim light middleweight title in 2019. At regional level he held the WBC-NABF and WBO-NABO light middleweight titles between 2018 and 2019. As of November 2022, he is ranked as the 7th best active middleweight by The Ring Magazine.

Adames represented the Dominican Republic in the World Series of Boxing between 2014 and 2015, accumulating a 4–2 record.

Professional career

Adames vs. Souffrant 
Adames made his professional debut in July 2015, defeating Jeff Souffrant by unanimous decision after four rounds.

Adames vs. Figueroa 
Adames won the vacant WBA Fedecaribe welterweight title in his seventh bout, beating Kelly Figueroa.

Adames vs. Lopez 
He won another vacant title in his next fight, defeating Patrick Lopez with a fourth-round technical knockout for the WBA Fedelatin title.

Adames vs. Molina 
In July 2017, he defeated welterweight contender Carlos Molina by unanimous decision (110–98, 110–98, 109–99) after eleven rounds. Adames put on a dominant performance, dropping Molina in round two and outclassing him through the rest of the fight. However, the fight ended a ten-fight knockout streak for Adames.

On November, Adames was scheduled to face Frank Rojas in a welterweight bout as part of the 96th WBA Convention in Medellín, but the bout was called off after he failed to make weight.

Adames vs. Teixeira 
On 30 November, 2019, Adames faced Patrick Teixeira for the vacant WBO interim super welterweight title. Teixeira was ranked #2 by the WBO and #12 by both the WBC and the WBA. Teixeira beat Adames by unanimous decision. The scorecards were announced as 111-116, 113-114, 113-114 in favor of Teixeira.

Adames vs. Derevyanchenko 
On 5 December, 2021, Adames fought Sergiy Derevyanchenko. Derevyanchenko was ranked #4 by The Ring, #3 by the WBC and #14 by the WBA at middleweight. Adames beat Derevyanchenko by majority decision, with the scorecards reading 95-95, 93-97, 94-96 in his favor.

Professional boxing record

References

External links

Carlos Adames - Profile, News Archive & Current Rankings at Box.Live

Living people
1994 births
Dominican Republic male boxers
Welterweight boxers
Light-middleweight boxers
People from Comendador, Dominican Republic
20th-century Dominican Republic people
21st-century Dominican Republic people